Martin Crane OSA, DD (11 October 181821 October 1901), an Irish-born Australian suffragan bishop, was the first Roman Catholic Bishop of the Diocese of Sandhurst, serving between 1874 until his death in office in 1901.

Biography
Crane was born in Bannow, County Wexford, Ireland, the son of James Crane, a farmer and his wife, Mary. Together, they had five sons, who all became priests and a sister who became a Carmelite nun.

Crane received his early education at Wexford and joined the Augustinian order at Grantstown and completed his ministerial studies in Rome. Crane was ordained a priest at Perugia, Italy on 12 April 1841 at age 22. He later returned to Ireland.

He was consecrated bishop in St Mary's Pro-Cathedral, Dublin on 21 September 1874. He left for Australia the next year and was installed on 16 May 1875. He greatly expanded the Diocese of Sandhurst in Victoria, increasing the number of resident priests and building new schools and churches.

Bishop Crane died on 21 October 1901, aged 83 in Victoria.

Since Crane's death, Shepparton's Notre Dame College have named one of their six houses in his name.

References

External links
 Bishop Martin CraneDiocese of Sandhurst website

1818 births
1901 deaths
Augustinian bishops
People from County Wexford
19th-century Roman Catholic bishops in Australia
Irish expatriate Catholic bishops
Australian people of Irish descent
Roman Catholic bishops of Sandhurst